has been the President of Tokyo Medical and Dental University since April 2008. He became a professor in their Stomatognathic dysfunction Department in May 1987 and Vice-President of the University in November 2005.

References

Japanese dentists
Academic staff of Tokyo Medical and Dental University
Year of birth missing (living people)
Living people
Place of birth missing (living people)